After School Club, often shortened to ASC, is a South Korean interactive music talk show that primarily airs on Arirang TV. Premiering on April 17, 2013, the show is currently co-hosted by Allen and Taeyoung of Cravity and Aaron Kwak.  After School Club's live broadcast spotlights Korean musicians, primarily K-pop idols and groups, and is spoken in English as the program is directed towards an international audience.

After School Club is produced by Lee Hyun-ah and executive produced by Summer Jung. Aside from its television broadcasts, After School Club is also livestreamed online and utilizes social media technologies such as Twitter and Google Hangouts to directly interact with international fans. Through this, the show features a live audience consisting of the guests' fans that are shown through video chats.

Premise and format
ASC features various musical guests of South Korea and the series is directed at an international audience so the principal language is English with Korean subtitles and translations produced on air. Fans can join in on the live broadcasts through video chats in Google Hangouts, send in tweets to the show's official Twitter account, and are also able to share comments, ask questions, and request music videos on the show's official Facebook account. The show is also livestreamed on Viki, Soompi, DramaFever, Youtube, and V Live.

Two activities that take place every episode are the Roll Calls and Hangouts. During the "Roll Call" portion Twitter users tweet their name, location, the time and generally a short message to the weekly guest. Those that participate may be singled out during the beginning of the episode and given a shout out by the guest. "Hangouts" are typically done twice an episode where some fans are selected for a real-time Google Hangout on the show which usually involves something (such as a song or dance) prepared by the fan to show to the guest(s) and a request. Other activities include prepared performances for fans by the guests, such as impressions, dances, and short parodies.

On March 5, 2014 (episode 48) the show expanded to include a second episode every week known as the After School Club After Show which features other guest appearances and behind-the-scenes footage from the previous episodes. The production team announced on Twitter that the After Show segment would be retired; the last After Show was on February 25, 2015 (episode 148).

The show joined V Live on August 25, 2015, Instagram on June 1, 2016, and Snapchat on January 2, 2017.

A new logo and a new studio set was introduced beginning from Episode 361 on March 26, 2019.

Hosting history
The original hosts of After School Club were Eric Nam and Jang Han-byul. 15&'s Park Jimin (now going by the name Jamie) was originally a guest for episode 67 as part of 15& and was an occasional co-host for the main show/MC of After Show from episode 87 onwards. Jamie was promoted to co-host of the main show after the cancellation of After Show. U-KISS's Kevin Woo was originally a guest on episode 3 and was a co-host for the main show from episode 43 onwards.

On April 11, 2016, it was announced that Eric would be leaving the show, the April 12 episode being his last appearance. On June 21, 2016, it was announced that Jae of Day6, who was a guest on episode 214, would be a co-host starting with episode 218.

On April 3, 2018, it was announced that Kevin would be graduating as MC of the show. His last episode as an MC was on April 10 and ASC held graduation ceremony for him on April 17.

On July 5, 2018, it was announced that Jae would be graduating as MC of the show after two years, with his last episode airing on July 17. On July 18, it was announced that Seungmin of Stray Kids and Han Hee-jun would co-host with Jamie. Seungmin left the show on December 12 due to scheduling conflicts. Seungmin's last episode aired on December 25.

On March 20, 2019, it was announced on Twitter that Kim Woo-sung of The Rose will be the third MC beginning with episode 361 on March 26, 2019. Woosung left the show on December 31 due to his future promotions and busy performance schedules. He was replaced by Park Yu-ri of JxR, whose first episode aired on March 3, 2020. Yuri departed after the August 25, 2020 episode. In October 2020, Jaeyun of TO1 was announced as the new co-host of After School Club, and he begin emceeing starting from the October 13 episode.

On September 1, 2021, it was announced that Kim Byeongkwan of A.C.E would be replacing Heejun as the new co-host of the program, following Heejun's departure following the August 31, 2021 episode. Byeongkwan graduated from the show on March 22, 2022 due to his impending enlistment in the military. He was replaced by Cravity's Allen.

Jaeyun graduated from the show on June 21st. He was replaced by former NU'EST member Aaron Kwak beginning from the July 26th episode. After hosting for over seven years, Jamie departed the show following the August 16th episode to focus on her music career and to work on her new album. She was replaced by Cravity's Taeyoung beginning from the September 6 episode.

Current cast

Former cast

Cast timeline

Guest cast 
 6 episodes
 Young K
 5 episodes
 Ashley
 4 episodes
 Benji
 Brad
 Min
 3 episodes
 BM
 Kevin Woo
 Yechan
 2 episodes
 Amber
 Moon
 NS Yoon-G
 Sanchez
 Tia
 Bang Chan
 Peniel
 Taeyoung
 1 episode
 BamBam
 Kevin
 Rome
 Sam
 Felix
 Junghoon
 Bernard

List of episodes and guests

References

External links 

 

South Korean music television shows
2000s South Korean television series